The Olympic Sports Park Swim Stadium was a venue used for the diving, swimming, water polo, and the swimming portion of the modern pentathlon events for the 1928 Summer Olympics in Amsterdam.

The swimming basin was made of reinforced concrete that was 50 m long by 18 m wide with the deepest part near the diving area at 5 m. Stands were erected at both sides with one of them at most accommodating 6000 spectators. There were 20 men's and 16 women's dressing rooms.

A temporary structure, it was demolished following the Olympics in 1929.

References
1928 Summer Olympics official report. pp. 193, 205–9, 277.

Venues of the 1928 Summer Olympics
Defunct sports venues in the Netherlands
Olympic diving venues
Olympic modern pentathlon venues
Olympic swimming venues
Olympic water polo venues
Sports venues in Amsterdam
Sports venues completed in 1928
1928 establishments in the Netherlands
20th-century architecture in the Netherlands